Nelinho Minzún Quina Asín (born 11 May 1987) is a Peruvian footballer who plays for Cusco FC in the Torneo Descentralizado, as a left back. He is the twin brother of Minzum Quina.

Club career
Nelinho Quina made his debut in the Torneo Descentralizado in 2005 playing for Sporting Cristal. In his debut season, he was part of the team that finished as champions of the 2005 Torneo Descentralizado season.

Honours

Club 
Sporting Cristal
Torneo Descentralizado: 2005

Juan Aurich
 Torneo Descentralizado: 2011

References

External links
Juan Aurich profile

1987 births
Living people
Footballers from Lima
Association football fullbacks
Peruvian footballers
Peru under-20 international footballers
Sporting Cristal footballers
Club Deportivo Universidad César Vallejo footballers
Alianza Atlético footballers
Club Universitario de Deportes footballers
K.V.C. Westerlo players
Juan Aurich footballers
FBC Melgar footballers
Peruvian Primera División players
Belgian Pro League players
Peruvian expatriate footballers
Expatriate footballers in Belgium